Capen may refer to:

11696 Capen, main belt asteroid
Capen (crater), crater on Mars
Capen Street (MBTA station), station on MBTA's Ashmont-Mattapan High Speed Line
Parson Capen House, built in 1683 as the home of local pastor the Reverend Joseph Capen
Elisha Capen Monk, American businessman and politician

Surname 
Charles L. Capen (1845–1927), Illinois lawyer
Elmer Hewitt Capen (1838–1905), the third president of Tufts College (now Tufts University)
Jerry Capen, fictional character on the American TV series The Larry Sanders Show
Joseph Capen (1658–1725), minister in Topsfield, Massachusetts, from 1681 to his death
Nahum Capen (1804–1886), American author and editor
Richard Goodwin Capen Jr. (born 1934), American ambassador
Ruth G. Capen (1893–1974), American chemist
Samuel Capen (1848–1943), sheriff of Norfolk County, Massachusetts
Samuel P. Capen (1878–1956), American educational administrator
Stephen Capen (1946–2005), popular American radio announcer and disc jockey